This was the first edition of the tournament, organised with a single-year license in 2021.

Astra Sharma won her first WTA Tour singles title, defeating Ons Jabeur in the final, 2–6, 7–5, 6–1.

Seeds

Draw

Finals

Top half

Bottom half

Qualifying

Seeds

Qualifiers

Draw

First qualifier

Second qualifier

Third qualifier

Fourth qualifier

References

External Links
Main Draw
Qualifying Draw

2021 WTA Tour
2021 MUSC Health Women's Open – 1